Lector is Latin for one who reads, whether aloud or not. It has various specialized uses.

Academic
The title lector may be applied to lecturers and readers at some universities. There is also the title lector jubilate, which is an equivalent of Doctor of Divinity.

In the teaching of modern languages at universities in the United Kingdom, a native speaker who assists with language skills may be called a lecteur/lectrice or Lektor/Lektorin.

In Dutch higher education the title lector is used for the leader of a research group at a university of applied science. The lector has a comparable set of tasks as (higher ranked) full professors at a (research) university, albeit at an applied rather than a fundamental scientific level.

Ecclesiastical

A religious reader is sometimes referred to as a lector. The lector proclaims the Scripture readings used in the Liturgy from the official liturgical book (lectionary).

Television
In Polish, lektor is also used to mean "off-screen reader" or "voice-over artist". A lektor is a (usually male) reader who provides the Polish voice-over on foreign-language programmes and films where the voice-over translation technique is used. This is the standard localization technique on Polish television and (as an option) on many DVDs; full dubbing is generally reserved for children's material.

Cigar production
Historically, lectors (known as lectores in Cuba) or readers in a cigar factory entertained workers by reading books or newspapers aloud, often left-wing publications, paid for by unions or by workers pooling their money. In the United States, the custom was common in the cigar factories of Ybor City in Tampa but was discontinued after the Tampa cigar makers' strike of 1931.

The practice apparently originated in Cuba, and is still known there today, where there were about 200 lectores as of 2010. Lectores were introduced in 1865 to educate and relieve boredom among cigar workers. Lectores, and their reading material, are chosen by the workers of the cigar factory. Lectores often take on extra-official roles and formerly acted as "spurs to dissent". As of 2017, UNESCO is considering designating the profession a form of "intangible cultural heritage".
The Montecristo brand of cigars derives its name for the fondness that cigar makers had for listening to The Count of Monte Cristo.

See also

Proctor

References

Latin words and phrases